The Women's Combined in the 2017 FIS Alpine Skiing World Cup involved three events, first a super-combined (downhill and one run of slalom), and then two Alpine combined (a Super-G and one run of slalom).  Downhill champion Ilka Štuhec of Slovenia  won the super-combined and held on to win the season championship. Interestingly, in only her second race in the combined discipline ever, overall World Cup champion Mikaela Shiffrin won the final race. 

The season was interrupted by the 2017 World Ski Championships, which were held from 6–20 February in St. Moritz, Switzerland. The women's combined was held on 10 February.

At this time, combined races were not included in the season finals, which were held in 2017 in Aspen, Colorado (USA).

Standings

DNF1 = Did Not Finish run 1
DNF2 = Did Not Finish run 2
DNS = Did Not Start
DSQ1 = Disqualified run 1
DSQ2 = Disqualified run 2

See also
 2017 Alpine Skiing World Cup – Women's summary rankings
 2017 Alpine Skiing World Cup – Women's Overall
 2017 Alpine Skiing World Cup – Women's Downhill
 2017 Alpine Skiing World Cup – Women's Super-G
 2017 Alpine Skiing World Cup – Women's Giant Slalom
 2017 Alpine Skiing World Cup – Women's Slalom

References

External links
 

Women's Combined
FIS Alpine Ski World Cup women's combined discipline titles